Hydnocarpus wightianus or chaulmoogra is a tree in the Achariaceae family. Hydnocarpus wightiana seed oil has been widely used in traditional Indian medicine, especially in Ayurveda, and in Chinese traditional medicine for the treatment of leprosy. It entered early Western medicine in the nineteenth century before the era of sulfonamides and other antibiotics for the treatment of several skin diseases and leprosy. The oil was prescribed for leprosy as a mixture suspended in gum or as an emulsion.

Common names
Common name: Jangli almond

 Hindi: कालमोगरा Calmogara, Chalmogra, Chaulmoogra, Jangli badam
 Kannada: Chalmogra yenne mara, Mirolhakai, Surti, Suranti, Toratti, Garudaphala
 Malayalam: Kodi, Maravatty, Marotti, Nirvatta, Nirvetti
 Marathi: Kadu Kawath
 Sanskrit: Tuvaraka, Turveraka, Tuvrak, कुष्टवैरी Kushtavairi
 Tamil: Maravetti, Maravattai, Marotti
 Telugu: Niradi-vittulu

Habitat
In India: It grows in tropical forests along western Ghats, along the coast from Maharashtra to Kerala, Assam, Tripura, often planted on road sides in hilly areas.

Other countries: The tree is found in South East Asia, chiefly in the Indo-Malayan region, and cultivated in  Sri Lanka, Nigeria and Uganda.

Morphology
Bark is brownish, fissured; blaze pinkish. Branch lets are round, minutely velvet-hairy. Midrib is raised above, secondary nerves 5–7 pairs. Its flowers have greenish white petals and are borne in short cymes or racemes, or sometimes appear by themselves in leaf axils. The flowering takes place from to January to April. They have numerous seeds.

Internally they contain 10–16 black seeds embedded in the fruit pulp. The seeds account for some 20% of the fruit weight. A typical tree produces  of seed/annum. The kernels make up 60–70% of the seed weight and contain 63% of pale yellow oil (mukherjee).

Chaulmoogra oil

The oil from the seeds of Hydnocarpus wightianus (Chaulmoogra) has been widely used in various forms of  traditional Indian medicine and in Chinese traditional medicine for the treatment of leprosy.  The oil was introduced into England by Frederic J. Mouat and it was used in its raw form both as topical and internal medicine. 

The chemical constituents of the oil were analyzed for their potential pharmacological activity by Frederick Belding Power, working for Wellcome Chemical Research Laboratories, in 1904. Power and colleagues isolated hydnocarpic acid, which had the formula C16H28O2, from seeds of both the Hydnocarpus Wightiana and Hydnocarpus anthelmintica trees. They introduced the extract into medical usage until sulfones and antibiotics become more dominant in the treatment of several skin diseases and leprosy.

Physical characteristics and composition
The oil is semi-solid at room temperature with no odor. Gas–liquid chromatography analysis has shown the oil to contain the following fatty acids – hydnocarpic acid, chaulmoogric acid, gorlic acid, lower cyclic homologues, myristic acid, palmitic acid, stearic acid, palmitoleic acid, oleic acid, linoleic acid and linolenic acid. The oil is unusual in not being made up of straight chain fatty acids but acids with a cyclic group at the end of the chain. The oil also contains 5′-methoxyhydnocarpin, an amphipathic weak acid, and isohydnocarpin.

The crude oil has a pale greenish-brown color, and can be easily purified into a white, watery oil containing three cyclopentene fatty acids.

Table: fatty acid composition of oil

Table of physical properties of oil

Extraction
Seeds are ovoid, irregular and angular, 1 to 1 1/4 inches long, 1 inch wide, skin smooth, grey, brittle; kernel oily and dark brown. A fatty oil is obtained by expression, known officially as gynocardia oil in Britain, as oleum chaulmoograe in the United States.

Fruits are plucked by climbing the tree or using long sticks with a sickle tied to it. The fruits are peeled by knife and the seeds are washed in water and then dried in sun. Seeds are decorticated (dehusked) by mallet, hand hammer, or decorticator. They may also be crushed in an expeller and rotary. The kernels yield 43% oil. The extracted oil is stored in zinc barrels until exported.

Leprosy

Chaulmoogra oil was commonly used in the early 20th century for the treatment of leprosy. It was applied topically (which was ineffective) or taken internally (more effective but nauseating and often rejected by people as worse than leprosy). The ingredient that appears to produce antimicrobial activity is hydnocarpic acid, a lipophilic compound. It may act by being an antagonist of biotin. American researcher Victor Heiser worked on developing a method of using the oil against leprosy by intravenous or intramuscular injection.

An ethyl ester of the oil (the "Ball method") was developed by Alice Ball in 1916, who died suddenly before publishing the technique. Her work was stolen by Arthur L. Dean who began producing large quantities of the treatment and named it after himself. 

It was then produced and marketed by Burroughs Wellcome (modern GlaxoSmithKline) in the early 1920s. The oil preparations were used intravenously for lepers. The oil was often obtained directly from trees in India, Sri Lanka or Africa. Doctors would locally prepare ethyl esters for treatments. In June 1927, Burroughs Wellcome released the commercial preparation  sodium hydnocarpate marketed as Alepol  which produced few unpleasant side effects. In May 1928, doctors reported cure of leprosy in some people treated with Alepol. In the 1940s, chaulmoogra oil was replaced by the more effective sulfones.

See also
Trees of India

References

External links
Pubs.acs.org

wightianus
Plants used in Ayurveda
Plants used in traditional Chinese medicine